, shortened to Nuku Nuku DASH, is a 12-episode Japanese anime OVA series and the third adaptation of the manga, All Purpose Cultural Cat Girl Nuku Nuku, created by Yuzo Takada. Nuku Nuku DASH was produced by the Banneko Dash Committee, which included Ashi Productions, MOVIC, and Starchild Records, and directed by Yoshitaka Fujimoto. The series was released on DVD in three volumes from September 23, 1998, to December 23, 1998. The English language was licensed by ADV Films and was also released on three DVD volumes from October 28, 2003, to January 20, 2004. Discotek Media announced the rescue license of this series, along with the original OVA and TV Series.

Plot summary
The Natsume family — Professor Kyusaku, his wife Akiko, and fourteen-year-old son Ryunosuke — take in a young woman by the name of Atsuko, who has lost her memory. Unbeknownst to all of them, Atsuko is an Androrobot prototype which has escaped from the power Mishima Corporation's research facilities.

In order to track down the missing prototype, Mishima transferred Akiko, who is employed by the corporation, to a new secret department the hunt for the Androrobot. Professor Kyusaku has secrets of his own and discovers that Atsuko is an Androrobot and sneaks Atsuko down into his hidden lab under the house in order to attempt to unlock her secrets. Ryunosuke knows there's something different about Atsuko but she seems pretty normal outside of the fact that she can't remember anything about herself, and he is quite happy to have her around.

Differences from previous adaptations
Nuku Nuku DASH! is a completely alternate universe, as evidenced by the radical change in the ages and general appearances of most of the characters, though they do tend to retain some of their original look. In DASH!, Nuku Nuku has matured from a 14- to 16-year-old appearance to a 19-year-old and is much curvier than in the original OVAs or Nuku Nuku TV. She also sports green hair of a shade so light that it is often mistaken for blonde and golden eyes and has a form of selective memory loss, which is later explained near the end of the series when her memories are regained. She also enters tactical form, in which she can use her androbot powers, whenever the need arises. The civilians call Nuku Nuku in tactical form, 'Super Dynamite Girl'. Kyusaku is not her creator in DASH! but rather is a friend of her creator, a man known simply as Professor Higuchi. As a result, Nuku Nuku, despite still using the familiar nickname, is actually named Atsuko Higuchi in this series, and Kyusaku's son Ryunosuke falls head over heels in love with Nuku Nuku, occasionally encountering her super heroic alter ego, but does not learn the truth until the end of the series.

Akiko's Henchwomen Arisa and Kyouko are the same, with more significant changes to their personalities. The two have switched bodies. Arisa is now less implosive and more laid back and not as prone to violence, while Kyouko is now more aggressive and takes her job very seriously.

Reception
The English language release of Nuku Nuku Dash was received poorly by anime reviews, obtaining an overall score of 32 out of 100 from the Meta Anime Review Project. Jason Carter of the web publication Anime Jump! stated that he hated the series. Don Houston of DVD Talk complained that the show that appeared to be much older than it really was, using concepts that were ready done to death. Carlos Ross of T.H.E.M. Anime Reviews states that "DASH has little of what made [All Purpose Cultural Cat-Girl Nuku Nuku] work - when it comes to the been-there, done-that, so-last-century action sequences. What cheapens them even further is that this series has so much potential." Reviewer Chris Beveridge of AnimeOnDVD.com, however, gave a more positive light to the series by stating that he enjoyed the series more than he has expected to since he wasn't sure what else there could be done after the original series.

References

External links
 Starchild's official website

1998 anime OVAs
Action anime and manga
Comedy anime and manga
Mecha anime and manga
ja:万能文化猫娘DASH!